La Gloria Elementary School may refer to:
 La Gloria Elementary School in Gonzales Unified School District (California)
 La Gloria Elementary School in La Gloria Independent School District (Texas)